Birger Løvaas (November 24, 1901 – June 5, 1977) was a Norwegian actor and comedian.

Løvaas played Karl Anton over 2,000 times in Gideon Wahlberg's play Skjærgårdsflirt from 1928 to 1944, and he traveled throughout Norway with his theater. Skjærgårdsflirt was the most frequently viewed play of the twentieth century in Norway. Løvaas also played Karl Anton in the film version of Skjærgårdsflirt in 1932.

After the Second World War, Løvaas was engaged with both the People's Theater and the Oslo New Theater. He also appeared in the radio play Dickie Dick Dickens.

Filmography
1932: Prinsessen som ingen kunne målbinde as the suitor
1932: Skjærgårdsflirt as Karl Anton
1958: Bustenskjold as Bernt Skomaker
1963: Freske fraspark as Martin
1964: Marenco as Askild
1965: Stompa forelsker seg as the police officer
1968: Smuglere
1969: Olsen-banden as the station attendant
1970: Olsenbanden og Dynamitt-Harry as the maintenance inspector
1973: To fluer i ett smekk as the station master

References

External links
 
 Birger Løvaas at the Swedish Film Database
 Birger Løvaas at Sceneweb
 Birger Løvaas at Filmfront

1901 births
1977 deaths
Norwegian male stage actors
Norwegian male film actors
Norwegian male television actors
20th-century Norwegian male actors